Panarukan is a district in Situbondo Regency, East Java, Indonesia. This sub-district is about 8 km from the capital city Situbondo to the west. The center of government is in the village of Wringin Anom.

Localities 
 Alas Malang
 Duwet
 Gelung
 Kilensari
 Paowan
 Paras
 Peleyan
 Sumber Kolak
 Wringin Anom

See also 
 List of districts of East Java

External links 
 Situbondo in Figures 2017 (BPS)

Districts of East Java